Dolopichthys is a genus of dreamers.

Species
There are currently seven recognized species in this genus:
 Dolopichthys allector Garman, 1899
 Dolopichthys danae Regan, 1926
 Dolopichthys dinema Pietsch, 1972
 Dolopichthys jubatus Regan & Trewavas, 1932
 Dolopichthys karsteni Leipertz & Pietsch, 1987
 Dolopichthys longicornis A. E. Parr, 1927
 Dolopichthys pullatus Regan & Trewavas, 1932 (Lobed dreamer)

References

Oneirodidae
Marine fish genera
Taxa named by Samuel Garman